The Wairarapa  Rugby Football Union was formed in 1886 and played until 1971, when they amalgamated with the Bush Rugby Football Union to form Wairarapa Bush Rugby Football Union.

All Blacks
Wairarapa had 15 All Blacks between 1903 and 1971.

Ranfurly Shield
Wairarapa held the Ranfurly Shield, briefly in 1927, and again between 1928 and 1929. They held it again for one match in 1950 before losing it to South Canterbury.

References
 NZ Rugby Almanack
 The Shield by Lindsay Knight

Defunct New Zealand rugby union governing bodies
Sports organizations established in 1886
1886 establishments in New Zealand
1971 disestablishments in New Zealand